Scrivener is a word-processing program and outliner designed for authors. Scrivener provides a management system for documents, notes and metadata. This allows the user to organize notes, concepts, research, and whole documents for easy access and reference (documents including rich text, images, PDF, audio, video, web pages, etc.). Scrivener offers templates for screenplays, fiction, and non-fiction manuscripts. After writing a text, the user may export it for final formatting to a standard word processor, screenwriting software, desktop publishing software, or TeX.

Features
Features include a corkboard, the ability to rearrange files by dragging-and-dropping virtual index cards on the corkboard, an outliner, a split screen mode that enables users to edit several documents at once, a full-screen mode, the ability to export text into multiple document formats (including popular e-book formats like EPUB and Mobipocket for Kindle, and markup languages such as Fountain, HTML, and MultiMarkdown), the ability to assign multiple keywords (and other metadata) to parts of a text and to sort the parts by keyword (such as characters, locations, themes, narrative lines, etc.), hyperlinks between parts of a text, and "snapshots" (the ability to save a copy of a particular document prior to any drastic changes).

Scrivener allows photos, URLs, and multiple other file formats, to be dragged into its interface as well. Because of its breadth of interfaces and features, it has positioned itself not only as a word processor, but as a project management tool for writers, and includes many user-interface features that resemble Xcode, Apple's integrated development environment (IDE). One computer programmer has called Scrivener "an IDE for writing".

Platforms 
Keith Blount created, and continues to maintain, the program as a tool to help him write the "big novel", allowing him to keep track of ideas and research. It is built mostly on libraries and features of Mac OS X from version 10.4 onward. In 2011, a Windows version of the software was released, written and maintained by Lee Powell.

iOS 
Scrivener for iOS was launched July 20, 2016. Current version is 1.2.1 and requires iOS 9+.

Linux 
There is no official release for Linux; there is a public beta version which has been abandoned, but still is available to use.

Macintosh 
The latest version of Scrivener for Mac is version 3.2.3, and requires macOS Sierra or newer. Scrivener can be obtained from the Mac App Store, but since the Mac App Store application is only usable on OS X 10.6.6 and later, users of earlier versions of OS X must buy it directly from the developer's website instead of the Mac App Store.

The company also makes Scrivener 2.5 available for earlier version of Mac OS X, but claims it is the final version of the software that was built to run on both PowerPC and Intel systems running Mac OS X 10.4 through 10.8. This version is available on the direct sale page in the sidebar titled "Mac OS X 10.4–8 and PowerPC".

In addition to the Scrivener version 2 releases, the direct download page provides access to the obsolete version 1.54, but licenses are no longer available for purchase. The 1.54 release is compatible with Mac OS X versions 10.4 through 10.6.

Windows 
The latest stable version of Scrivener for Windows is 3.1.1. This upgrade "[r]equires Windows 7 SP1+
with .NET Framework 4.6.2+, and a minimum display resolution of 1024x768px" according to Literature & Latte's website. Those who bought Scrivener 1 on or later than 20th November 2017 qualify for a free upgrade. Those who bought Scrivener 1 before that date qualify for a 49% discount.

See also
 Calibre (software)
 Comparison of text editors
 List of text editors
 Sigil (application)
 Storyist
 yWriter

References

External links
 
 
 
 

2007 software
Word processors
MacOS word processors
Personal information managers
Outliners
Screenwriting software